Quinn Gleason (born November 10, 1994) is an American professional tennis player.

Born in Mendon, New York to parents Cynthia Constantino and Sean Gleason, Quinn has an older brother Sean, and a younger sister Aerin.

Gleason first played college tennis at the University of Notre Dame.

Tennis career
As of June 2019, Gleason has won one singles title and 13 doubles titles on the ITF Circuit. She has career-high WTA rankings of 323 in singles and 134 in doubles.

Gleason played her first Grand Slam championship in 2021, at Wimbledon. She also competed for the New York Empire in WorldTeam Tennis in that year.

She won her first ITF title 2017 at Indian Harbour Beach, in the doubles draw, partnering Kristie Ahn.

WTA Challenger finals

Doubles: 1 (runner-up)

ITF finals

Singles: 2 (1 title, 1 runner–up)

Doubles: 29 (13 titles, 16 runner–ups)

Notes

References

External links
 
 

1994 births
Living people
American female tennis players
People from Mendon, New York
Notre Dame Fighting Irish women's tennis players
Tennis people from New York (state)